Little Jerusalem can refer to:
Little Jerusalem (Burlington, Vermont), Burlington's historic Jewish quarter
Little Jerusalem (film), a 2005 film
Portobello, Dublin, an area in Dublin